Uncle Henry's is an American online and printed classified advertisements repository, founded by Henry Faller in Rockland, Maine, and printed in Augusta, Maine.

Established in 1969, Uncle Henry's helps people buy, sell, swap or trade a variety of items. Its tagline is Most Anything Under the Sun. It is published weekly on Thursdays and is priced at $2.00 for the printed edition. In addition to Maine, the printed version is available in New Hampshire, Vermont, Massachusetts and New Brunswick, Canada (where it is $2.25). Digital "satellite" versions are  available for download in Georgia and Indiana. Adverts are limited to thirty words. 

A radio show, named Talkin' Deals, is broadcast on Saturdays via streaming and on the Maine radio stations WLOB, WBAN, WEZR and WPNO.

Uncle Henry's was the inspiration for the reality television programme Down East Dickering, on which it is referred to as the bible.

Founder
Henry Conrad Faller (August 14 1927 – March 21 2012) was born in Newark, New Jersey, the son of William and Cecilia. He married Helen Sonnenberg in 1952, and the couple moved to Maine to live and raise their family. The couple started their own printing establishment in Rockland, Maine, in 1968. He printed the first edition of Uncle Henry's the following year.

He retired in 1989 and died, after a battle with Alzheimer's disease, in 2012, aged 84.

References

External links
Uncle Henry's official website

Weekly magazines published in the United States
Magazines established in 1969
Magazines published in Maine
Online magazines published in the United States